Cocteau Twins was a Scottish rock band active from 1979 to 1997. They were formed in Grangemouth by Robin Guthrie (guitars, drum machine) and Will Heggie (bass), adding Elizabeth Fraser (vocals) in 1981 and replacing Heggie with multi-instrumentalist Simon Raymonde in 1983. The group earned critical praise for their ethereal, effects-laden sound and the soprano vocals of Fraser, whose lyrics often eschew any recognisable language. They pioneered the 1980s alternative subgenre of dream pop and helped define what would become shoegaze.

After signing with the British record label 4AD in 1982, they released their debut album Garlands later that year. The addition of Raymonde in 1983 solidified their final lineup, which produced their biggest hit in the UK, "Pearly-Dewdrops' Drops", peaking at No. 29 on the UK Singles Chart. In 1988, Cocteau Twins signed with Capitol Records in the United States, distributing their fifth album, Blue Bell Knoll, through a major label in the country. After the 1990 release of their most critically acclaimed album, Heaven or Las Vegas, the band left 4AD for Fontana Records, where they released their final two albums.

After nearly 20 years together, the band disbanded in 1997 in part due to issues stemming from the disintegration of Fraser and Guthrie's romantic relationship. In 2005, the band announced that they would reunite to headline Coachella and embark on a world tour but the reunion was cancelled a month later after Fraser refused to perform on stage with Guthrie. In a 2021 interview, Raymonde confirmed that Cocteau Twins "will never reform".

History

Early years, 1979–1983
Guthrie and Heggie, both from Grangemouth, Scotland, formed the band in 1979. At a local disco called The Hotel International in 1981, they met the 17-year-old Fraser when Guthrie was DJing, and she became the group's vocalist. 

Prior to releasing their debut album, the band recorded a four track session for John Peel in June 1982, including "Wax and Wane" and "Garlands". Their debut LP Garlands, released by 4AD in July 1982, was an instant success, peaking at number 2 in the indie albums chart in the UK. Sounds wrote that the style of the band was "mixing strong Siouxsie and the Banshees and Joy Division influences". NMEs Don Watson compared it to gothic rock bands such as Gene Loves Jezebel and Xmal Deutschland, while Spin magazine's Sue Cummings compared it retrospectively to Siouxsie and the Banshees and Bauhaus. In 1983, the band released a second EP, Peppermint Pig.

Cocteau Twins' sound on their first three recordings relied on the combination of Heggie's rhythmic basslines, Guthrie's minimalist guitar melodies, and Fraser's voice. The band's next full-length LP record, Head over Heels, relied solely on the latter two, following Heggie's amicable departure after the tour that followed the release of Peppermint Pig (he would later join Lowlife). This led to the characteristic Cocteau Twins sound: Fraser's voice, by turns ethereal and operatic, combined with increasingly effects-heavy guitar playing by Guthrie (who has often said that he is far more interested in the way the guitar is recorded than in the actual notes being played, though he later admitted that his reliance on effects and layering was initially due to his own technical limitations).

In 1983 the band participated in 4AD's This Mortal Coil project, which spawned a cover version of Tim Buckley's "Song to the Siren" (performed by Guthrie and Fraser). Despite appearing under the This Mortal Coil name, the cover has subsequently become one of the best-known Cocteau Twins tracks. During the TMC sessions, Guthrie and Fraser became acquainted with another project contributor, multi-instrumentalist Simon Raymonde (formerly a member of Drowning Craze), who joined Cocteau Twins later that year.

Rise to fame, 1984–1989

With Raymonde, the band released a series of critically acclaimed albums and EPs that explored their new style. These included The Spangle Maker (1984), Treasure (1984), Aikea-Guinea (1985), Tiny Dynamine (1985), Echoes in a Shallow Bay (1985), and Love's Easy Tears (1986). Raymonde, who was called in to work on the second album by This Mortal Coil, did not participate in the recording of the fourth Cocteau Twins LP, Victorialand (1986), a predominantly acoustic record which featured only Guthrie and Fraser. Raymonde returned to the group for The Moon and the Melodies (1986), a collaboration with ambient composer Harold Budd, which was not released under the Cocteau Twins name.

In 1985 4AD signed an agreement with Relativity Records for distribution of Cocteau Twins releases in the US and other territories. To commemorate the event, the compilation The Pink Opaque (1985) was released as a way of introducing the new, broader audience to the band's back catalogue.

While remaining a 4AD band internationally, Cocteau Twins finally signed a major-label contract with Capitol Records in 1988 for distribution in the United States, and released their fifth album, Blue Bell Knoll, in September of that year. "Carolyn's Fingers" was heavily played on the U.S. radio stations, peaking at No. 2 on Billboard's Alternative Songs chart.

Mainstream success, 1990–1994
 
The group released Heaven or Las Vegas in late 1990. The most commercially successful of their many recordings, the album reached number seven in the UK Albums Chart immediately after its release. Despite the success of the record and the subsequent concert tours, not everything was well with the band. They parted ways with 4AD following Heaven or Las Vegas partly because of conflicts with the label's founder Ivo Watts-Russell, and were close to breaking up over internal problems due in large part to Guthrie's substance abuse.

While on their international tour supporting Heaven or Las Vegas, the group signed a new recording contract with Mercury Records subsidiary Fontana for the UK and elsewhere, while retaining their US relationship with Capitol. In 1991, 4AD and Capitol released a box set that compiled the band's EPs from 1982 to 1990, and also included a bonus disc of rare and previously unreleased material.

Fraser and Guthrie ended their 13-year relationship in 1993, and by this time had a young child, Lucy Belle, born in 1989. The band's seventh LP, Four-Calendar Café, their first since Fraser and Guthrie's separation, was released in late 1993. The band explained that Four-Calendar Café was a response to the turmoil that had engulfed them in the intervening years, with Guthrie entering rehab and quitting alcohol and drugs, and Fraser undergoing psychotherapy.

Milk & Kisses and break-up, 1995–1997
1995 saw the release of two new EPs: Twinlights and Otherness. Some of the tracks on Twinlights and Otherness were versions of songs from the band's eighth album, Milk & Kisses (1996). The record saw the return of more heavily layered guitars, and Fraser began once again to obscure her lyrics, though not entirely. Two singles were taken from the album: "Tishbite" and "Violaine"; both exist in two CD versions, with different B-sides included on each. The band, augmented by an extra guitarist and a drummer, toured extensively to support the album, their last for Mercury/Fontana. A new song, "Touch Upon Touch", which debuted during the live shows and was recorded later in 1996 was also one of the two songs written and arranged by Fraser, Guthrie and Raymonde for Chinese pop singer Faye Wong for her Mandarin album Fuzao released in June 1996, the other being "Tranquil Eye" from Violaine released in October 1996.

In 1997, while recording what was to have been their ninth LP, the trio disbanded over irreconcilable differences in part related to the breakup of Guthrie and Fraser. While a number of songs were partially recorded and possibly completed, the band has stated that they will likely never be finished or released in any form.

Post-breakup
 
In 1999 Bella Union, the record label founded by Guthrie and Raymonde, released a double-CD Cocteau Twins compilation entitled BBC Sessions. The collection is a complete record of the band's appearances on UK radio programs from 1982 to 1996, with rare and unreleased material included. In 2000, 4AD released Stars and Topsoil, a compilation of selected songs picked by the band members that had been released during their years with 4AD; all recordings had been digitally remastered by Guthrie. Finally, in 2003, 4AD followed Stars and Topsoil with the release of digitally remastered versions of the first six Cocteau Twins LPs.

On 31 January 2005, Cocteau Twins announced that they would be reforming to perform at the Coachella Valley Music and Arts Festival on 30 April 2005, and later indicated that additional tour dates would be added. However on 16 March, the reunion was cancelled after Fraser announced that she would not take part. In a 2009 interview, Fraser said she could not go through the pain of sharing the stage with her former lover Guthrie, the issue behind the band's 1997 breakup. Raymonde revealed that the band had also booked a 55-date world tour, which would have paid him £1.5 million. Later in 2005, 4AD released a worldwide limited edition of 10,000 compilation box set titled Lullabies to Violaine, a 4-disc set that details every single and EP released from 1982 to 1996. This was shortly followed up by two 2-disc sets of the same names, known as Volume 1 and Volume 2.

Since March 2007, the band has started podcasts of exclusive material. On 6 October 2008, Cocteau Twins were awarded the Q Awards Inspiration Award, which they accepted in a rare collective live appearance.

In 2022, Fraser, Guthrie and Raymonde were awarded with the Visionary Award by The Ivors Academy. Fraser and Guthrie attended the award ceremony in London in May 2022 in a rare public appearance since the band's disbandment in 1997.

Solo work
 
The former members of Cocteau Twins have remained active musically in the years since the band's demise. In addition to forming Bella Union, Guthrie and Raymonde have produced releases from new bands signed to that label.

Raymonde released the solo album Blame Someone Else as the first release on Bella Union. He also co-produced the posthumous album by Billy Mackenzie from the Associates, then went on to produce several Domino Records artists like James Yorkston, Archie Bronson Outfit (whom he later managed) and Clearlake. More recently he has produced the UK band the Duke Spirit, London-based duo Helene, former Golden Virgins frontman Lucas Renney and has mixed the Mercury Prize nominated album The End of History by Fionn Regan. In his role running Bella Union, he has discovered such artists as Laura Veirs, Fleet Foxes, Midlake, Lift to Experience, the Low Anthem, I Break Horses, the Czars and John Grant. The label is renowned for its long-term relationships with its artists, such as Beach House who have released all four of their albums with Bella Union, as have Dirty Three, Midlake etc. Raymonde picked up the Independent Record Company of the Year award at the Music Week Awards (as voted by UK independent retailers) in 2010, 2012 and 2014.

Guthrie has released six solo albums – Imperial, Continental, Carousel, Emeralds, Fortune, and Pearldiving– and eight EPs. He toured extensively with his band Violet Indiana, which included ex-Cocteau Twins guitarist Mitsuo Tate in the line-up. He has also scored the music for three movies — Gregg Araki's Mysterious Skin (in collaboration with Harold Budd), Dany Saadia's 3:19 Nada Es Casualidad (a Mexican/Spanish production), and again with Gregg Araki and Harold Budd on the score and the soundtrack of White Bird in a Blizzard. He reunited with Budd to collaborate on two companion albums, Before the Day Breaks and After the Night Falls, and the albums Bordeaux, Winter Garden (a collaboration that included Italian electronica artist Eraldo Bernocchi), and Another Flower, which was released after Budd's passing in 2020. In 2006, Guthrie produced three songs on Mahogany's Connectivity. He also produced and played guitar on Apollo Heights debut album, White Music for Black People.

Fraser provided guest vocals on the Future Sound of London's single "Lifeforms" (1993), vocals for three songs on Massive Attack's Mezzanine in 1998 (as well as touring with them several times), and for other musical projects and groups. Notably, she wrote the lyrics and sang the vocals for "Teardrop" by Massive Attack which was released as a single in 1998 and reached number 10 in the UK singles chart It has been speculated that she has been working on a solo album, though details of this are as yet unavailable. Fraser provided the vocals for "Lament for Gandalf" in The Lord of the Rings: The Fellowship of the Ring. In 2000 she sang with Peter Gabriel on  Ovo (The Millennium Show). In 2005, she worked with Breton musician Yann Tiersen on two songs for his album Les retrouvailles. In 2009, she released the single "Moses" on Rough Trade.

Musical style and influences
Cocteau Twins' early recordings were classified in the gothic rock and post-punk genres. The band's influences at the time they formed included The Birthday Party (drummer Phill Calvert encouraged the group to sign to 4AD), Sex Pistols, Kate Bush and Siouxsie and the Banshees (Fraser had Siouxsie tattoos on her arms for several years). The band was named after the early Simple Minds song "The Cocteau Twins" (later rewritten as "No Cure"). As the band's sound developed, their subsequent music was classified as dream pop and ethereal wave. Cocteau Twins' music influenced numerous artists in different genres, including Deftones, the Weeknd, Napalm Death, John Grant, Prince, Sigur Rós and Massive Attack.

Members
 Elizabeth Fraser – vocals (1981–1997)
 Robin Guthrie – guitars, bass, production, drum machine (1979–1997)
 Will Heggie – bass (1979–1983)
 Simon Raymonde – bass, guitars, piano (1983–1997)
Touring contributors: 
 Ben Blakeman – additional guitars (1990–1994)
 Mitsuo Tate – additional guitars (1989–1996)
 Benny Di Massa – drums (1994–1996)
 David Palfreeman – percussion (1993–1996)

Discography

 Garlands (1982)
 Head over Heels (1983)
 Treasure (1984)
 Victorialand (1986)
 Blue Bell Knoll (1988)
 Heaven or Las Vegas (1990)
 Four-Calendar Café (1993)
 Milk & Kisses (1996)

Bibliography
 The First Time I Heard Cocteau Twins (2012), edited by Scott Heim. Rosecliff Press.

See also 
List of ambient music artists

References

External links
 
 Cocteau Twins on 4AD website

 
4AD artists
Musical groups established in 1979
Musical groups disestablished in 1997
Dream pop musical groups
British gothic rock groups
Female-fronted musical groups
Scottish post-punk music groups
People from Grangemouth
Fontana Records artists
Ethereal wave musical groups
1979 establishments in Scotland